"Happy Birthday" is a song by American power pop band the Click Five. It was released as the second single for Thailand and the Philippines and the third single for Singapore and Malaysia taken from their album Modern Minds and Pastimes.

Chart performance

See also
 List of birthday songs

External links
The Click Five official website
Music video of "Happy Birthday"

2007 singles
The Click Five songs
Lava Records singles
Songs written by Chris Braide
Songs written by Ben Romans
Songs written by Jez Ashurst
2007 songs